Playgirl is the fourth studio album by Japanese singer and songwriter Rina Aiuchi. It was released on December 15, 2004, through Giza Studio. The album consists of three previous released singles, such as Dream×Dream, Start and Boom-Boom-Boom. The first press release included bonus track "DreamXDream-Love&Wishes Version-". The album charted at #7 on the Oricon charts in its first week. It charted for eight weeks.

Track listing

In media
Playgirl – theme song for Nihon TV program Motor Sports
Start – opening theme for Anime television series Detective Conan
Boom-Boom-Boom – ending theme for Nihon TV program Coming Doubt
 opening theme for Nihon TV program Ongaku Senshu Music Fighter
Step up! – opening theme for Nihon TV program Sports Uru Sugu
Love-formation – theme song for MBS program Koshien Bowl
DreamXDream – theme song for anime movie Detective Conan: Magician of the Silver Sky

References

2004 albums
Being Inc. albums
Japanese-language albums
Giza Studio albums
Albums produced by Daiko Nagato